John Kellogg (June 3, 1916 – February 22, 2000) was an American actor in film, stage and television. Some sources, including ancestry.com, state that his given name was Giles Vernon Kellogg, Jr.

Biography

Kellogg began his acting career in the 1930s as Giles V. Kellogg, starring in the long-running comedy Brother Rat. Meanwhile, he acted on stage in several plays until World War II broke out. He turned to the film industry, playing bit parts in several films. In 1946, he signed a contract at Columbia Pictures. Throughout his career, Kellogg played mostly secondary roles. In a Season 6 episode of Bonanza, he played "Frank Reed" alongside Dan Duryea in "Logan's Treasure". In 1969 Kellogg appeared as Mel Dover on the TV western The Virginian in the Episode titled Stopover.

Kellogg died in Los Angeles in 2000 of Alzheimer's disease.

Selected filmography
In the 1950s and 1960s, Kellogg was mostly seen on television. He guest starred in several TV series, including three episodes of Adventures of Superman (coincidentally and prominently sponsored by Kellogg's). He is most famous for his portrayal of bad guy Jack Chandler in the soap opera Peyton Place, a role he played between 1966 and 1967.

 High School (1940) - Tommy Lee
 Young Tom Edison (1940) - Bill Edison
 Sailor's Lady (1940) - Sailor (uncredited)
 Yesterday's Heroes (1940) - Ticket Seller (uncredited)
 The Monster and the Girl (1941) - Cub Reporter (uncredited)
 Knockout (1941) - Murphy, a Fighter (uncredited)
 Mob Town (1941) - Brick (uncredited)
 Among the Living (1941) - Reporter (uncredited)
 Pacific Blackout (1941) - Bombardier Sergeant (uncredited)
 Captains of the Clouds (1942) - Aircraftsman Lawrence (uncredited)
 To Be or Not to Be (1942) - Polish RAF Flyer (uncredited)
 Come on Danger (1942) - Kid (uncredited)
 The Pride of the Yankees (1942) - Fraternity Boy (uncredited)
 Wing and a Prayer (1944) - Assistant Air Officer (uncredited)
 Thirty Seconds Over Tokyo (1944) - C-47 Transport Pilot (uncredited)
 This Man's Navy (1945) - Junior Pilot (uncredited)
 Main Street After Dark (1945) - Soldier Assisting Police (uncredited)
 The Crimson Canary (1945) - Keys
 What Next, Corporal Hargrove? (1945) - Wilkins (uncredited)
 A Walk in the Sun (1945) - Riddle
 Because of Him (1946) - Reporter (uncredited)
 Miss Susie Slagle's (1946) - Dark-Haired Boy (uncredited)
 Without Reservations (1946) - Reporter (uncredited)
 Somewhere in the Night (1946) - Hospital Medical Attendant
 The Strange Love of Martha Ivers (1946) - Joe (uncredited)
 Johnny O'Clock (1947) - Charlie
 Out of the Past (1947) - Charlie Cook
 Suddenly It's Spring (1947) - Newsreel Man (uncredited)
 Mr. District Attorney (1947) - Franzen
 King of the Wild Horses (1947) - Danny Taggert
 Robin Hood of Texas (1947) - Nick
 The Gangster (1947) - Sterling
 Out of the Past (1947) - Lou Baylord (uncredited)
 Killer McCoy (1947) - Svengross - Pool Player (uncredited)
 Secret Service Investigator (1948) - Benny Deering
 Sinister Journey (1948) - Lee Garvin
 Fighting Back (1948) - Sam Lang
 Station West (1948) - Ben
 Bad Men of Tombstone (1949) - Curly
 The Doolins of Oklahoma (1949) - Townsman (uncredited)
 Hold That Baby! (1949) - Mason
 House of Strangers (1949) - Danny (uncredited)
 Port of New York (1949) - Lenny
 Samson and Delilah (1949) - Temple Spectator (uncredited)
 Twelve O'Clock High (1949) - Major Cobb
 Bunco Squad (1950) - Fred Reed
 Kansas Raiders (1950) - Red Leg leader
 The Du Pont Story (1950) - John (uncredited)
 Hunt the Man Down (1950) - Kerry 'Lefty' McGuire
 The Enforcer (1951) - Vince
 Tomorrow Is Another Day (1951) - Dan Monroe
 Come Fill the Cup (1951) - Don Bell
 Elephant Stampede (1951) - Bob Warren
 The Greatest Show on Earth (1952) - Harry
 Rancho Notorious (1952) - Jeff Factor
 Jet Job (1952) - Alvin Fanchon
 The Raiders (1952) - Jack Welch
 The Silver Whip (1953) - Slater
 Fighting Lawman (1953) - Lem Slade - aka Sam Logan
 Those Redheads from Seattle (1953) - Mike Yurkil
 Gorilla at Large (1954) - Morse 
 African Manhunt (1955) - Sergeant Jed Drover
 Edge of the City (1957) - Detective
 Go Naked in the World (1961) - Cobby - Hotel Detective
 Convicts 4 (1962) - Guard #2
 Knife for the Ladies (1974) - Hollyfield
 Blind Justice (1986) - Jim's father
 Violets Are Blue (1986) - Ralph Sawyer
 Orphans (1987) - Barney

References

External links

1916 births
2000 deaths
Deaths from dementia in California
Deaths from Alzheimer's disease
American male film actors
American male television actors
20th-century American male actors
Male actors from Hollywood, Los Angeles